Stephen Pirrie (born 23 March 1961) is a former Australian rules footballer who played with Richmond, St Kilda and Essendon in the Victorian Football League (VFL).

Pirrie, an Old Xaverian, started his career in the Hawthorn reserves. Both his father, Kevin, as well as his uncle, Richard, had played league football for Hawthorn. His grandfather, Richard Pirrie, had not only played VFL football with Melbourne, but also had played VFA football with Richmond. Unlike his father, Pirrie never broke into the Hawthorn seniors and instead made his VFL debut with Richmond.

A defender, he appeared in the final ten games of the 1982 home and away season for Richmond, but wasn't selected for the finals.

Having not played a single VFL game in 1983 and after playing the opening round of the 1984 season for Richmond, Pirrie was traded to St Kilda, in return for Jeff Dunne. He was reported for misconduct during his final game for Richmond, in that he threw his mouthguard to hinder Footscray's full forward Simon Beasley, who kicked 11 goals. He was later found not guilty of the charge.  He was only able to make seven appearances at his new club and in 1985 made his way to reigning premiers Essendon, where he played just once.

He had a brief stint with Port Melbourne in 1987, playing 2 games and scoring 8 goals.

See also
 List of Australian rules football families

Footnotes

References 
 Hogan P: The Tigers Of Old, Richmond FC, (Melbourne), 1996. 
 Maplestone, M., Flying Higher: History of the Essendon Football Club 1872–1996, Essendon Football Club, (Melbourne), 1996.

External links
 
 Stephen Pirrie, australianfootball.com.
 Steve Pirrie, The VFA project.

1961 births
Australian rules footballers from Victoria (Australia)
Richmond Football Club players
St Kilda Football Club players
Essendon Football Club players
Old Xaverians Football Club players
Port Melbourne Football Club players
Living people